Despite its Italian name, the Piatti scooter was of Belgian (and later, British) manufacture, being originally produced in 1954 in Belgium by D'Ieteren. Its name came from its designer, Vincent Piatti.

In 1956, production also commenced at the Cyclemaster works at Byfleet in Surrey, England.

However, the increasing availability of affordable small cars in Europe affected sales of the Piatti (and other scooters) and production eventually ceased. According to Erwin Tragatsch in a brief entry on the Piatti scooter in his Illustrated Encyclopedia of Motorcycles, Cyclemaster "failed to find many customers for this product", and manufactured only a small number before British production terminated.

The Piatti scooter has the dubious distinction of being, in the words of Bob Currie (author of Great British Motorcycles of the Sixties), "the worst scooter ever perpetrated."

Notes

External links
Alan Abrahams, 'The Piatti Scooter'

Motor scooters
Scooter manufacturers